Chabyshevo is a rural locality (a village) in Denyatinskoye Rural Settlement, Melenkovsky District, Vladimir Oblast, Russia. The population was 18 as of 2010. There are 4 streets.

Geography 
Chabyshevo is located on the Kartyn River, 32 km north of Melenki (the district's administrative centre) by road. Papulino is the nearest rural locality.

References 

Rural localities in Melenkovsky District